Anna Byford Leonard (July 31, 1843 – ) was an American reformer, who was the first woman who was appointed sanitary inspector. She also served as president of the Woman's Canning and Preserving Company.

Early years
Anna Byford was born in Mount Vernon, Indiana, July 31, 1843. She was a daughter of the physician and surgeon, William Heath Byford, of Chicago, Illinois. He was the founder and president of the Woman's Medical College of Chicago.

Career
In 1889, Leonard was appointed sanitary inspector, being the first woman who ever held that position, and was enabled to carry out many of the needed reforms It was through her instrumentality, aided by the other five women on the force, that the eight-hour law was enforced, providing that children under fourteen years of age should not work more than eight hours a day. That was enforced in all dry-goods stores. Through her endeavors seats were placed in the stores and factories, and the employers were instructed that the girls were to be allowed to sit when not occupied with their duties. She was enabled to accomplish this through the fact that the physicians and women of Chicago were ready to sustain her, and the other fact that her position as a sanitary inspector of the health department made her an officer of the police force, thus giving her authority for any work she found necessary to do. As a result of this eight-hour law, schools were established in some of the stores from eight to ten a. m.. giving the younger children, who would spend that time on the street, two hours of solid schooling. Leonard was an artist of ability, having studied abroad and traveled extensively.

Byford was a Theosophist. Some of her papers are held by New York Historical Society Museum & Library.

References

Attribution

External links
 

1843 births
People from Mount Vernon, Indiana
American social reformers
American food industry business executives
American women business executives
American Theosophists
Year of death missing
Wikipedia articles incorporating text from A Woman of the Century